Hugh F. J. Boyle (28 January 1936 – 23 May 2015) was an Irish professional golfer best known for his achievements in the mid-1960s.

Boyle was born in Omeath, County Louth, Ireland. In 1966 he was the winner of both the Yomiuri International and the Daks Tournament, in 1965 he was second in the Senior Service Tournament while in 1967 he gained a second place in the Schweppes Open (PGA Championship) He finished in eighth place at the 1967 Open Championship, behind the champion, Roberto De Vicenzo, and, second placed, Jack Nicklaus, at the Royal Liverpool Golf Club. His final round of 68 was the best by a PGA member that year and won him the Tooting Bec Cup. He also won the Irish PGA Championship in 1967.

Boyle represented Ireland in the 1967 World Cup in Mexico City, partnering Christy O'Connor Snr. He played in the 1967 Ryder Cup team, where he lost twice against Arnold Palmer in the pairs and to Gay Brewer in the singles.

Boyle held the professional course record at the Royal Norwich Golf Club with a score of 66.

In 1983, Boyle became a head professional at the Royal Wimbledon Club, a position he retained for over twenty years.

Professional wins (5)

Far East Circuit wins (1)
1966 Yomiuri International

Other wins (4)
1966 Daks Tournament
1967 Irish PGA Championship, Blaxnit (Ulster) Tournament
1970 Irish Dunlop Tournament

Results in major championships

Note: Boyle only played in The Open Championship.

CUT = missed the half-way cut (3rd round cut in 1972 Open Championship)
"T" indicates a tie for a place

Team appearances
Ryder Cup (representing Great Britain): 1967
World Cup (representing Ireland): 1967
R.T.V. International Trophy (representing Ireland): 1967
Double Diamond International (representing Ireland): 1971, 1972

References

Irish male golfers
Ryder Cup competitors for Europe
1936 births
2015 deaths